Behind the Mask may refer to:

Film and television 
 Behind the Mask (1932 film), a film featuring Boris Karloff
 Behind the Mask (1936 film) or The Man Behind the Mask, a British mystery film by Michael Powell
 Behind the Mask (1946 film), a film starring Kane Richmond as the character The Shadow
 Behind the Mask (1958 film), a film starring Michael Redgrave
 Behind the Mask (1991 film), a documentary film about the Irish Republican Army
 Behind the Mask, a 1997 film featuring Cyril Nri
 Behind the Mask (1999 film), a film starring Donald Sutherland
 Behind the Mask (2002 film), a 2002 unauthorized documentary about Slipknot
 Behind the Mask (2006 film), a documentary about the Animal Liberation Front
 Behind the Mask: The Rise of Leslie Vernon, a 2006 horror film
 Behind the Mask (documentary series), a 2013 documentary series about sports mascots
 Marvel's Behind the Mask, a 2021 documentary film special from Marvel

Literature 
 Behind the Mask (memoir), a 2016 book by Patrick Treacy
 Behind the Mask: My Autobiography, a 2019 book by Tyson Fury
 Behind the Mask, an autobiography by American baseball umpire Dave Pallone
 Behind the Mask: On Sexual Demons, Sacred Mothers, Transvestites, Gangsters, Drifters, and Other Japanese Cultural Heroes, a book by Ian Buruma
 "Behind the Mask", a short story by Lin Carter, included in the collection The Xothic Legend Cycle: The Complete Mythos Fiction of Lin Carter

Music 
 Behind the Mask (album) or the title song, by Fleetwood Mac, 1990
 "Behind the Mask" (song), by Yellow Magic Orchestra, 1978; covered by several performers
 "Behind the Mask", a song by Anarchy Club, 2005
 "Behind the Mask", a song by Twice from Eyes Wide Open, 2020
 "Behind the Mask", the theme song for the TV series Queen of Swords, performed by Jose Feliciano, 2000

Other uses 
 Behind the Mask (NPO), a non-profit African LGBT rights organisation

See also 
 Behind a Mask, a novella by Louisa May Alcott
 Behind a Mask (album), a 2013 album by Louna
 The Face Behind the Mask (disambiguation)